Dahyak is a village in northern Tajikistan. It is part of the city Istaravshan in Sughd Region.

References

Populated places in Sughd Region